Our Very Own may refer to

 Our Very Own (1950 film)
 Our Very Own (2005 film)